The Mind's Eye is a 2015 American science fiction horror film written and directed by Joe Begos. The film stars Graham Skipper, Lauren Ashley Carter, John Speredakos, Larry Fessenden, Noah Segan and Matt Mercer. The film was released on August 5, 2016, by RLJ Entertainment.

Cast
Graham Skipper as Zack Connors
Lauren Ashley Carter as Rachel Meadows
John Speredakos as Dr. Michael Slovak
Larry Fessenden as Mike Connors
Noah Segan as Travis Levine
Matt Mercer as David Armstrong
Michael A. LoCicero as Kurt Thompson
Jeremy Gardner as Vince
Patrick M. Walsh as Officer Rayne
Brian Morvant as Tommy
Josh Ethier as Jim Robbins
Susan T. Travers as Nurse Potter
Chuck Doherty as Gary

Release
The film premiered at the 2015 Toronto International Film Festival on September 15, 2015. The film was released on August 5, 2016, by RLJ Entertainment.

Reception
The film has received mixed-to-positive reviews from critics and currently holds a 62% on the review aggregator Rotten Tomatoes with the consensus stating, "The Mind's Eye packs a bloody B-movie punch, although it's gleeful indulgence in gore may test the limits of all but the least squeamish".

References

External links
 

2015 films
2015 horror films
American science fiction horror films
2010s science fiction horror films
2010s English-language films
2010s American films